Eucalyptus × erythrandra, commonly known as rosebud gum, is a species of mallee or shrub that is endemic to Western Australia. It grows in mallee scrub in the Esperance Plains and Mallee biogeographic regions.

This eucalypt was originally given the name Eucalyptus erythrandra by William Blakely and Henry Steedman who published the description in Proceedings of the Linnean Society of New South Wales. It is now accepted by the Australian Plant Census as a hybrid, either between E. incrassata and E. tetraptera or between E. angulosa and E. tetraptera.

References

x erythrandra
Myrtales of Australia
Eucalypts of Western Australia
Plants described in 1938
Taxa named by William Blakely
Plant nothospecies